Tuse is a village in Denmark, located about  west of Holbæk. It has a population of 1,176 (1 January 2022). Tuse is located in Holbæk Municipality and therefore is part of the Zealand Region.

The town has a relatively large local historical significance, as it controlled trade between Holbæk Fjord and the area further up from the stream of Tuse Å in ancient times. The town has thus given its name to the late Tuse Herred and Tuse Næs.

Notable people 
 Frederik Tingager (1993–), Danish professional footballer
 Morten Frendrup (2001–), Danish professional footballer

References

Holbæk Municipality
Cities and towns in Region Zealand